Gray-Nicolls is an English cricket equipment and clothing brand and is a subsidiary of Grays International. Formed as a result of merger between two companies, Grays and Nicolls, the company is based in Robertsbridge, East Sussex. 

Gray-Nicolls manufactures and commercialises a wide range of products for cricket equipment, such as bats, batting gloves, balls, pads, athletic shoes, team uniforms, and bags.

History 

The Gray company was founded as H.J. Gray and Sons by H.J. Gray in 1855. This company later began manufacturing cricket bats for leading Cambridge University cricketers such as Ranjitsinjhi and the then Prince of Wales and remained a family business. L.J. Nicolls started manufacturing cricket bats in 1876.

These two manufacturers merged in the early 1940s and thus Gray-Nicolls was formed. After World War II, famous cricket stars such as England Captain Wally Hammond and Australian all-rounder Keith Miller started to use Gray-Nicolls bats.

In 1974 the company introduced the 'scoop' bat, sometimes named as cricket's most famous bat.

Sponsorships
Gray-Nicolls has had sponsorship deals with many leading international cricketers, including Indians Sunil Gavaskar, Karun Nair, Manish Pandey, Australians George Bailey, Shaun Marsh, Mitchell Marsh, Aaron Finch, Travis Head, Cameron Green, Beth Mooney and Elyse Villani, New Zealanders Kane Williamson, Daryl Mitchell, Henry Nicholls and Amelia Kerr, English players Andrew Strauss, Alastair Cook, James Anderson,  Sam Billings , Ben Foakes and Mike Atherton, and Pakistanis Mohammad Rizwan, Babar Azam and Shan Masood.

See also 
 Grays International

References

External links
 

Cricket equipment manufacturers
British brands
Sporting goods manufacturers of the United Kingdom